U Pinnyasiha, commonly known as the Shwe Nya Wa Sayadaw, is a Burmese Theravada Buddhist monk, best known for teaching at Yangon Buddhist University in Kyimyindaing Township in Yangon. In December 2011, he met with Hillary Clinton, US Secretary of State, along with other civil society delegates.

He was born in 1965 to U Htun Yin and Daw Hla Tot, in Phayagon village, Mandalay Division.

In February 2012, Shwenyawa Sayadaw, the abbot of the Sadhu Pariyatti Monastery, was evicted from his monastery by the State Sangha Maha Nayaka Committee for alleged disobedience, by holding a sermon at the Mandalay office of the National League for Democracy in September, where he had publicly called for the release of political prisoners and the end of ongoing civil wars.

Shwenyawa Sayadaw is known to be a controversial and outspoken figure, he has criticised many of his peers in the Buddhist clergy for corruption and failure to live up their religious obligations, as well as speaking out against the government and the military. Most notably he is known for his strong opposition to the nationalistic and anti-Muslim 969 movement, Shwenyawa Saydaw urged for calm and restraint during the 2013 Burma anti-Muslim riots.

In the wake of the 2021 Myanmar coup d'état on 1 February, he was detained by the Myanmar Armed Forces.

References

External links 
 new.asiaone.com
 BBC Asia
 Shwe Nya War Sayadaw said broke media ethics 
 Shwe Nya War Sayadaw and 99% Buddhist monks agreed and recommended on 969 campaign.This is the interview of U Khin Maung Soe of Radio Free Asia to Shwe Nya War Sayadaw with English subtitle

1965 births
Theravada Buddhist monks
Burmese Buddhist monks
People from Mandalay Region
Living people